Christiania Township is a township in Jackson County, Minnesota, United States. The population was 331 at the 2000 census.

Christiania Township was organized in 1871. Christiana is an old name for Oslo, Norway.

Geography

Demographics
As of the census of 2000, there were 331 people, 128 households, and 98 families residing in the township.  The population density was 9.3 people per square mile (3.6/km2).  There were 190 housing units at an average density of 5.4/sq mi (2.1/km2).  The racial makeup of the township was 97.58% White, 1.51% from other races, and 0.91% from two or more races. Hispanic or Latino of any race were 1.51% of the population.

There were 128 households, out of which 29.7% had children under the age of 18 living with them, 70.3% were married couples living together, 3.9% had a female householder with no husband present, and 22.7% were non-families. 22.7% of all households were made up of individuals, and 4.7% had someone living alone who was 65 years of age or older.  The average household size was 2.59 and the average family size was 3.00.

In the township the population was spread out, with 26.6% under the age of 18, 5.4% from 18 to 24, 23.9% from 25 to 44, 31.4% from 45 to 64, and 12.7% who were 65 years of age or older.  The median age was 43 years. For every 100 females, there were 119.2 males.  For every 100 females age 18 and over, there were 115.0 males.

The median income for a household in the township was $41,172, and the median income for a family was $48,125. Males had a median income of $32,500 versus $18,906 for females. The per capita income for the township was $19,565.  About 1.9% of families and 1.7% of the population were below the poverty line, including none of those under age 18 and 3.9% of those age 65 or over.

Politics
Christiania Township is located in Minnesota's 1st congressional district, represented by Mankato educator Tim Walz, a Democrat. At the state level, Christiania Township is located in Senate District 22, represented by Republican Doug Magnus, and in House District 22B, represented by Republican Rod Hamilton.

References

Townships in Jackson County, Minnesota
Townships in Minnesota